The Islamic Azad University, Shahr-e-Qods Branch (Persian: دانشگاه آزاد اسلامی واحد شهر قدس, Dāneshgāh-e Āzād-e Eslāmi vahed-e Shahr-e Qods) is a comprehensive branch of Islamic Azad University in Qods, Tehran Province, Iran. It is also the fourth out of ten of the best non-profit universities in Iran (which makes it as a high-ranking one specially among the Azad University Branches). It has 4 faculties, 2 research centers and one research and science campus near the main campus, offering up to 300 disciplines at undergraduate, graduate and doctorate levels with over 35,000 students. The academic staff includes 180 faculty members and about 900 visiting professors.

History
The Islamic Azad University Shahr-e-Qods Branch (QODSIAU) began its activities at a temporary campus in Qods, Tehran, in November 1998. The first intake of 700 students for the academic session 1998-1999 began on 20 September 1998.

Initially offering 7 programmes, QODSIAU now offers 309 disciplines at undergraduate, graduate and doctorate levels for almost 20,000 students.

QODSIAU finances are essentially based on tuition fees, although in recent years the university is attempting to diversify its sources of income through commercialization of its researches.

Campuses

Shahr-e Qods Campus 
Main campus in Qods is built over tens of hectares of land on the west of Tehran province and near the Qods city. The campus is expanding rapidly and presently is home to the most of the faculties, one research center, libraries and laboratories and sport complexes.

Science and Research Campus (Shahr-e Qods S & R) 
The Science and Research campus established in 2011 alongside the main campus and in 2012 administration offices and most of the postgraduate classes moved there. the main building of the Research and Science campus is Velayat Building and has 7000 square meters of built space and a six-story building.

Infrastructures and facilities 
A main campus of 157652 square meters and Research and Science campus of 7100 square meters
The total construction area of 112641 square meters
The total administrative and educational area of 61000 square meters
The total under-construction area of 6500 square meters.
The total green space of 15000 square meters
The total gardening and agricultural area of 50000 square meters
4 sports complexes with the total area of 11500 square meters in the following fields: ping pong, body building, karate, futsal, basketball, volleyball, chess, handball, badminton, fitness program, taekwondo
1 mosques with the total area of 1200 square meters
5 meeting and conference halls seating 3500 people
5 faculties with the total area of 45200 square meters

Faculties and Departments

Faculty of Engineering 
 Department of Computer Science
 Department of Electrical Engineering
 Department of Civil Engineering
 Department of Urban Planning
 Department of Food Engineering
 Department of Architecture

Faculty of Agriculture 
 Department of Agronomy and Plant Breeding
 Department of Agricultural Economies
 Department of Irrigation
 Department of Animal Science
 Department of Food Industry
 Research Center of Medicinal Plants

Faculty of Humanities and Social Sciences 
 Department of Law and Political Science
 Department of Management
 Department of Accounting
 Department of Physical Education & Sports Science
 Department of Linguistics
 Department of Religions & Islamic Mysticism
 Department of General Lessons & Islamic Sources

Faculty of Basic Sciences 
 Department of Mathematics
 Department of Physics
 Department of Organic Chemistry
 Department of Analytical Chemistry
 Department of Applied Chemistry
 Department of Pure Chemistry
 Department of Molecular Biology
 Department of Zoology

References

sh
Education in Tehran Province
Qods County